The Ojika-class patrol vessel is a class of PL type patrol vessels of the Japan Coast Guard.

Design 

In contrast to the Nojima, which had a helicopter deck one level higher than the strength deck, this class utilizes the end of the strength deck as the helicopter deck, and has a reinforced structure to land a large Super Puma helicopter. In addition, a well dock was installed below the helicopter deck to accommodate a high speed launch, but it was not efficient as planned and discontinued after the second ship.

The chimney was split into two and placed on both sides of the ship. Between these funnels, a hangar for the ROV and a preparation room for diving operations were set up.

Ships in the class

Notes

References

Bibliography

External links
 

Patrol vessels of the Japan Coast Guard
Patrol ship classes